Arpád Albert Graf und Freiherr von Bothmer zu Schwegerhoff (17 September 1858, Ardó (Szőlősardó, Borsod-Abaúj-Zemplén County), in the county of Ugocsa - 3 July 1938, Dunaalmás)

His parents were Carl Alexander Friedrich Graf und Freiherr von Bothmer zu Schwegerhoff and Rosa von Szabó de Sepsi-Szent-György. His father was born in Eickhoff, the family estate. He was one of 6 children. He married Helene Marie Isidora von Pilaszanovits in Budapest, Hungary on 15 March 1890. They had 4 children.

Military career 
Schwegerhoff was k.u.k. Major General, Knight of the Order of the Iron Crown III Class, owner of military Merit and the war medal etc. He was appointed a lieutenant in 1879 to k.k. Infantry Regiment No. 67 and took part in 1882 to defeat the uprising in Herzegovina as Kompagnieoffizer (company officer). Then in 1889 as a lieutenant on the Royal-Honvéd infanterie (Royal Hungarian Military) he translated and then acted in the years 1908 to 1911 as a colonel and commander of the Hungarian Royal Gyulaer 2nd - Honvéd Infantry Regiment. Since November 1911 Major General Schwegerhoff was the Commander of the Royal Hungarian 75th Honvéd Infantry Brigade in Kolozsvár. For his merits as a military commander he was awarded The Order of the Iron Crown III Class in 1910.

He died in Duna-Almás on 3 July 1938.

See also 
 Military of Hungary

References 
 Die Familie von Bothmer by Dr. Hermann von Bothmer
 Interview with George Criser Graf und Freiherr von Bothmer zu Schwegerhoff
 Der Oesterreichische-Kaiserliche Orden Der Eisernen Krone und Seine Mitglieder - Wien 1912

Hungarian generals
Austro-Hungarian generals
Hungarian nobility
People from Borsod-Abaúj-Zemplén County
1858 births
1938 deaths